The Mayor of Piacenza is an elected politician who, along with the Piacenza's City Council, is accountable for the strategic government of Piacenza in Emilia-Romagna, Italy. The current Mayor is Katia Tarasconi, a member of the centre-left party Democratic Party, who took office on 29 June 2022.

Overview
According to the Italian Constitution, the Mayor of Piacenza is member of the City Council.

The Mayor is elected by the population of Piacenza, who also elect the members of the City Council, controlling the Mayor's policy guidelines and is able to enforce his resignation by a motion of no confidence. The Mayor is entitled to appoint and release the members of his government.

Since 1994 the Mayor is elected directly by Piacenza's electorate: in all mayoral elections in Italy in cities with a population higher than 15,000 the voters express a direct choice for the mayor or an indirect choice voting for the party of the candidate's coalition. If no candidate receives at least 50% of votes, the top two candidates go to a second round after two weeks. The election of the City Council is based on a direct choice for the candidate with a preference vote: the candidate with the majority of the preferences is elected. The number of the seats for each party is determined proportionally.

1806–1946

Italian Republic (since 1946)

City Council election (1946–1994)

From 1946 to 1994, the Mayor of Piacenza was elected by the city's Council.

Direct election (since 1994)
Since 1994, under provisions of new local administration law, the Mayor of Piacenza is chosen by direct election.

Timeline

See also
 Timeline of Piacenza

References

Bibliography
 

Piacenza
Mayors of places in Emilia-Romagna
People from Piacenza
Politics of Emilia-Romagna
Piacenza